Events from the year 1950 in Denmark.

Incumbents
 Monarch – Frederick IX
 Prime minister – Hans Hedtoft (until 30 October), Erik Eriksen

Events
 9 January – Denmark becomes one of the first European countries to recognize the People's Republic of China.

Sports
 2027 August Denmark wins one gold medal, one silver medal and one bronze medal at the 1947 European Aquatics Championships.

Badminton
 14 March  All England Badminton Championships
 Tonny Ahm wins gold in Women's Single at the All England Badminton Championships.
 Jørn Skaarup and Preben Dabelsteen wins gold in Men'S Double
 Tonny Ahm and Kirsten Thorndahl wins gold in Women's Double
 Poul Holm and Tonny Ahm win gold in Mixed Fouble

Births
 26 May – Esben Storm, Danish-Australian screenwriter, director and actor (died 2011)

Deaths
 11 January – Karin Michaëlis, journalist and author (born 1872)
 16 February – Johannes Hjelmslev, mathematician, discoverer and eponym of the Hjelmslev transformation (born 1873)
 9 May – Vilhelm Lundstrøm, painter (born 1893)
 26 May – Louis Larsen, gymnast, silver medalist at the 1906 Intercalated Games (born 1874)
 5 June – Rudolph Tegner, sculptor linked with the Symbolist movement (born 1873)
 3 August – Georg Høeberg, composer and conductor (born 1872)
 10 September – Prince Erik, Count of Rosenborg (born 1890)
 3 October – Elna Borch, naturalism and symbolism sculptor (born 1869)
 25 November – Johannes V. Jensen, author, recipient of the Nobel Prize in Literature in 1944 (born 1873)

References

 
Denmark
Years of the 20th century in Denmark
1950s in Denmark
1950 in Europe